Gábor Preisich (12 May 1909 – 21 April 1998) was a Hungarian architect. He won the Herder Prize in 1975 along with Romanian poet Nichita Stănescu.

Works

Buildings designed
 1932. Budapest I., Gellérthegy utca 6. tenement house (in partnership with Aladár Münnich)
 1933. Budapest II., Káplár utca 7. tenement house (in partnership with Mihály Vadász)
 1933. Budapest XIV., Erzsébet királyné útja 30/b tenement house (in partnership with Mihály Vadász)
 1933-34. Budapest XI., Bartók Béla (volt Horthy Miklós) út 62-64. tenement house and Simplon-, later Bartók Cinema (in partnership with Mihály Vadász)
 1934-35. Budapest VIII., Köztársaság (earlier: Tisza Kálmán) tér 14, 15, 16. - Vay Ádám utca 2. tenement house (in partnership with: Bertalan Árkay, Sándor Faragó, József Fischer, Károly Heysa, Pál Ligeti, Farkas Molnár, Móricz Pogány, Mihály Vadász)
 1935. Budapest XII., Városmajor utca 26/b. tenement house (in partnership with Mihály Vadász)
 1935. Budapest XIV., Örs vezér út 52. family house (in partnership with Mihály Vadász)
 1936. Budapest XII., Bazin utca 20. family house (in partnership with Mihály Vadász)
 1936. Budapest XII., Rácz Aladár út 46. family house (in partnership with Mihály Vadász)
 1936. Budapest XII., Tusnádi utca 34. family house (in partnership with Mihály Vadász)
 1937. Budapest I., Krisztina krt. 69. tenement house (in partnership with Mihály Vadász)
 1937. Budapest II., Margit krt. 65. tenement house (in partnership with Mihály Vadász)
 1937-38. Budapest I., Csalogány utca 4/d. tenement house (in partnership with Mihály Vadász)
 1937-38. Budapest V., Balassi Bálint (earlier: Személynöki) utca 2-4. Markó utca 1. Széchenyi rkp. 12-13. és Kossuth tér 18. tenement house (in partnership with Mihály Vadász). The frontage design by Andor Wellisch.
 1940-41. Budapest XII., Városmajor utca 52. tenement house (in partnership with György Gerle)
 1941. Budapest I., Kosciusco Tádé (earlier: Koronaőr) utca 14. és Márvány utca 1/b. tenement house (in partnership with György Gerle)
 1942. Budapest XII., Hegyalja út 105. family house (in partnership with György Gerle)
 1942. Budapest II., Endrődi Sándor utca 18/a. family house (in partnership with György Gerle)
 1947. Budapest V., Bajcsy-Zsilinszky út 24. – Arany János utca 35. portal (in partnership with Lajos Gádoros)
 1947-49. Budapest V., Jászai Mari tér 1. - Széchenyi rakpart 19. Ministry of the Interior (today: The Office of the National Assembly) (in partnership with Ágost Benkhard, László Gábor, Lajos Gádoros, Andor Lévai, Gyula Rudnai)
 1948-50. Budapest VI., Dózsa György út 84/a. MÉMOSZ hall. today Liget-Center (in partnership with Lajos Gádoros, Imre Perényi, György Szrogh)
 1961. Budapest XII., Kékgolyó u. 1. apartment house (in partnership with Albert Kiss, Árpád Mester)
 1961. Budapest XI., Lágymányosi út, apartment houses
 1961. Budapest XI., Lágymányosi út, school of housing estate (in partnership with Albert Kiss, Árpád Mester)
 1964. Budapest II., Cseppkő utca 69. children's home
 1969. and 1974. Szigliget, summer house

Bibliography  
 PREISICH – SÓS A .- BRENNER J.: Budapest városépítészeti kérdései, Budapest, 1954
 PREISICH – REISCHL – VADÁSZ: Városi családi ház, Budapest, 1959
 Budapest városépítésének története I. Buda visszavételétől a kiegyezésig, Budapest, 1960
 Budapest városrendezési problémái [ed.], Budapest, 1963
 Budapest városépítésének története II. A Kiegyezéstől a Tanácsköztársaságig, Budapest, 1964
 Budapest városépítésének története III. A két világháború közt és a felszabadulás után, Budapest, 1969
 Walter Gropius, Budapest, 1972 (1981-ben lengyel, 1982-ben német kiadás) 
 Budapest jövője (ed.), Budapest, 1973
 Ernst May, Budapest, 1983
 Vélemények-viták a városépítésről [ed.], Budapest, 1984
 Budapest városépítésének története 1945-1990, Budapest, 1998
 Építészeti, városépítészeti pályafutásom története. Lapis angularis VII. Ed. Fehérvári Zoltán - Prakfalvi Endre, Budapest, 2009

Selected essays  
 A CIRPAC és a modern építészet, Magyar Szemle, 1931/9.
 Milyen lesz a jövő művészete, Független Kritika, 1 March 1935
 A háború utáni újjáépítés feladatai, Új Építészet, 1946/1.
 Hozzászólás Fülep Lajos: Egy nagy lehetőség Budapest újjáépítésében c. cikkéhez, Fórum, 1948
 Az építészeti forma kérdéséhez, Építés-Építészet, 1949/4.
 Feladataink az új Budapest felépítésében, Világosság, 17 Aug 1951
 A budapesti földalatti gyorsvasút városrendezési jelentősége, Magyar Építőművészet, 1953/3-4.
 Budapest városrendezési problémái, Magyar Építőművészet, 1953/5-6.
 A korszerű lakóház, Élet és Tudomány, 13 Oct. 1954
 Városépítés a Szovjetunióban, Magyar Építőművészet, 1954/10-12.
 Építőművészetünk problémái, Csillag, 1955/6.
 Budapest tíz éve, Magyar Építőművészet, 1955/3-5.
 Ízlés az építészetben – ízlés az utcán, Természet és Társadalom, 1955/11.
 A jövő Budapestje, Élet és Irodalom, 25 Oct. 1961
 Le Corbusier, a várostervező, Városépítés, 1965/5.
 A budapesti település-agglomeráció növekedése és az ebből adódó problémák, Demográfia, 1968/2.
Az elismerés és a kritika hangján a METRÓ-ról, Budapest, 1973/3.
Nyílt levél Bernáth Aurélhoz, Magyar Nemzet, 6 March 1973
 A METRÓ esztétikája, Művészet, 1973/10.
 Modernség (Hozzászólás a tulipán-vitához), Élet és Irodalom, 1975/11.
 Gondolatok a tömeges lakásépítés esztétikai kérdéseiről, Magyar Építőművészet, 1975/3.
 Elavult tömbök felújításos átépítése, Városépítés, 1975/1.
 Kételyeim (Hozzászólás a tulipán-vitához), Magyar Építőművészet, 1972/2.
 A Hilton-szálló a városképben, Budapest, 1977/3.
 Lakótelepek esztétikája, Budapest, 1977/3.
 Még mindig – Gropius?, Magyar Építőművészet, 1983/4.

1909 births
1998 deaths
20th-century Hungarian architects
Herder Prize recipients